The Canon de 155 L mle 1924 was a heavy gun used by Belgium during World War II. After the Germans occupied conquered Belgium in May 1940 they took over the surviving weapons as the 15.5 cm Kanone 432(b).

The gun were constructed using carriages of Krupp 13 cm Kanone 09 modified for motor traction in 1917. It broke down into two loads for transport.

References 
 Chamberlain, Peter & Gander, Terry. Heavy Artillery. New York: Arco, 1975 

World War II artillery of Belgium
155 mm artillery